HD 50499 b is an extrasolar planet approximately 154 light-years away in the constellation of Puppis.  The planet is suspected to be a gas giant with mass of 1.7 times Jupiter. It is a long period, taking 351 weeks to orbit the star. The planet's eccentric orbit passes through the average distance of 574 Gm.

The planet was discovered by four team members including Steve Vogt in 2005 using their radial velocity method, which used to measure changes in red- and blue-shifting of the star that indicate the presence of planets caused by gravitational tug. He also indicated the existence of two additional outer planets.

See also 
 HD 50554 b

References 

Puppis
Exoplanets discovered in 2005
Giant planets
Exoplanets detected by radial velocity

de:HD 50499 b